Mikkilineni may refer to:

 21704 Mikkilineni, a main-belt asteroid
 Mikkilineni (actor), a Telugu film actor and writer